Alice Lucille McCoy (born March 29, 1948) is an American politician who served as a member of the South Dakota House of Representatives for District 35 from 1999 to 2006.

Background 
Elected to the South Dakota House of Representatives in 1998, she assumed office in 1999 and served until 2006. 

Due to term limits, she could not run for re-election in 2006, and instead challenged State Senator Bill Napoli in the June 6, 2006 Republican primary. McCoy lost the nomination, receiving 35% of the vote.

McCoy lives in Rapid City, South Dakota. She and her husband, James McCoy, have two children.

External links
Alice McCoy's entry at the South Dakota Legislature website
Alice McCoy's record in the South Dakota Legislature's Historical Listing

References

1948 births
Living people
Members of the South Dakota House of Representatives
Politicians from Rapid City, South Dakota
Women state legislators in South Dakota
20th-century American politicians
20th-century American women politicians
21st-century American women politicians
21st-century American politicians
Candidates in the 2006 United States elections